Events in the year 2014 in Liberia.

Incumbents 

 President: Ellen Johnson Sirleaf
 Vice President: Joseph Boakai
 Chief Justice: Francis S. Korkpor, Sr.

Events
 March 30 – Liberia confirms its first two cases of Ebola in the Foya District in Lofa County.
 June 25 – Dudley McKinley Thomas is accredited as the Liberian ambassador to the People's Republic of China.
 July 26 – Tubman University President Dr. Elizabeth Davis Russell served as national Independence Day orator.
 August 6 – President Sirleaf declares a state of emergency due to the Ebola epidemic.
 November 13 – President Sirleaf lifts the state of emergency caused by the Ebola epidemic.
 December 10 – Ebola fighters are declared Time Person of the Year, with Liberian Ebola health care worker Salome Karwah appearing on the cover of the magazine.
 December 20
The Liberian Senate election takes place after being delayed twice due to the Ebola epidemic.
George Weah is first elected to the Senate, where he represents Montserrado County.
Full Date Unknown
The People's Unification Party is founded.

Deaths
 April 16 – Gyude Bryant, Chairman of the Transitional Government of Liberia (2003–2006), in Monrovia (b. 1949)

See also
Ebola virus epidemic in Liberia

References 

 
2010s in Liberia
Years of the 21st century in Liberia
Liberia
Liberia